Filipinos in Israel constitute one of the largest groups of immigrant workers in Israel. Israel is home to a population of almost 300,000 foreign workers, of which 30,000 to 50,000 are Filipinos.

Demographics

Reliable figures regarding the number of Filipinos in Israel are hard to come by as beyond those who are legally in Israel with government-issued work permits, there are many who are in the country illegally. The Philippine Embassy in Israel estimates that there are approximately 31,000 Filipinos legally working and living in Israel. Most of them live and work in Israel's largest cities, Tel Aviv, Jerusalem and Haifa. There is also a considerable number of Filipinos working in Beersheba, Netanya, Rehovot and Rishon LeZion, but live in Tel Aviv, where they normally spend their weekends.

Filipinos work primarily as caregivers to the elderly.

Recent plans to attempt to deport large numbers of Filipinos and other immigrant workers from Israel who are in the country illegally have caused concern among the Filipino community. Many children of Filipino workers were born in Israel, and face deportation.  In 2006, about 900 Filipino children were granted permanent residency in Israel, with that status to be extended to their parents and other family members once the children completed their military service.

Notable people
Rose Fostanes, Winner of The X Factor Israel (season 1)

See also  
Israel–Philippines relations

References

External links
Filipino community website

Asian diaspora in Israel
Israel
Foreign workers
Israel–Philippines relations